2019 in women's road cycling is about the 2019 women's bicycle races ruled by the UCI and the 2019 UCI Women's Teams.

UCI Women's WorldTour

Single day races (1.1 and 1.2)

† The clock symbol denotes a race which takes the form of a one-day time trial.

Events not returning from 2018
100 Cycle Challenge
Brabantse Pijl Dames Gooik
Durango-Durango Emakumeen Saria
Horizon Park Women Challenge
VR Women ITT
Winston-Salem Cycling Classic
GP della Liberazione
Veenendaal–Veenendaal Classic

Stage races (2.1 and 2.2)

Events not returning from 2018
Gran Premio Comite Olimpico Nacional Femenino
Panorama Guizhou International Women's Road Cycling Race
Tour of Dongting Lake International Women's Road Cycling Race
Tour of Eftalia Hotels & Velo Alanya
Tour of Zhoushan Island
Vuelta Internacional Femenina a Costa Rica
Le Tour de Femina Malaysia

Continental Championships

References

 

Women's road cycling by year